Ninja Tuna is the fourth studio album by British record producer Andrew "Mr. Scruff" Carthy, released on 6 October 2008 through Carthy's personal Ninja Tune imprint Ninja Tuna.

The track "Kalimba", which is a pop rock song, with synthesizers, and contains influences of jazz, electronic, and dance pop, was selected by Microsoft as the sample music for Windows 7 to demonstrate the new Windows Media Player.

A compilation of outtakes of the album, entitled Bonus Bait, was released in the following year.

In 2009 it was awarded a silver certification from the Independent Music Companies Association which indicated sales of at least 30,000 copies throughout Europe.

Track listing

Personnel
 Mr. Scruff (Andrew Carthy) – all instruments, production
 Alice Russell – vocals (2)
 Quantic (Will Holland) – vocals (3)
 Roots Manuva (Rodney Hylton Smith) – vocals (6)
 Danny Breaks (Daniel Whidett) – vocals (7)
 Andreya Triana – vocals (9)
 Pete Simpson – vocals (12)

References

External links
 Mr. Scruff's official website

Mr. Scruff albums
2008 albums
Ninja Tune albums
Microsoft Windows sample music